Bi Jingquan (born September 1955) is a Chinese politician who was director of the China Food and Drug Administration from 2015 to 2018. After the office was merged into the State Administration for Market Regulation (SAMR) in March 2018, he became the party secretary of SAMR. He was formerly a deputy secretary-general of the State Council and vice-president of the China Consumer Association.

Biography
Bi Jingquan graduated from the Economics Department of Peking University in 1982.

He has over twenty years experience in price control. He was editor-in-chief of Time-Bargain, published in 1994. In 2001, he worked on the resolution of problems produced by China's entry into the World Trade Organization. he also led his group to complete a report entitled Countermeasures Research on Promoting Competence of China's Various Industries in the Transitional Term. In 2004, he compiled the planning outline for the development of China's logistic industry. He also wrote and released many articles on topics such as trade, circulation, economic reforms and price administration. Bi is currently vice-president of the China Consumer Association, director of the China Cereal Economic Institution and executive director of the China Price Study Society.

References

1955 births
Living people
People's Republic of China politicians from Heilongjiang
People from Suihua
Members of the 19th Central Committee of the Chinese Communist Party
Peking University alumni